Manor Heights is a neighborhood located in Staten Island, New York City.  Manor comes from the fact that the neighborhood is adjacent to Manor Road, a major thoroughfare in the North Shore of Staten Island, and Heights due to the area's sudden elevation within its boundaries.  The neighborhood's loose boundaries include the areas south of the Staten Island Expressway, north of Brielle Avenue, which is the location of Susan E. Wagner High School, to the west of Manor Road, and to the east of Bradley Avenue.

Locally, the neighborhood is sometimes considered an overlapping of the Willowbrook, Meiers Corners and Todt Hill sections of Staten Island.

The area quickly populated with the rapid growth of Staten Island's population caused by the opening of the Verrazano-Narrows Bridge among other factors.  The neighborhood consists of relatively small, one-family homes.  Manor Heights is the site of Susan E. Wagner High School, opened in 1968 to accommodate the island's growing population.  A residential complex for low-income seniors, operated by the Sisters of Charity, was later built on land adjacent to the high school. Manor Heights also includes Public School 54 which is located in Willowbrook Rd

Manor Heights is serviced by the  local buses and the  express buses.

References 

Neighborhoods in Staten Island